Aachi & Ssipak is a 2006 South Korean adult animated comic science fiction action film directed by Jo Beom-jin and features the voices of Ryoo Seung-bum, Im Chang-jung, and Hyun Young.

Plot
Somewhere in the future, mankind has depleted all energy and fuel sources, however they have somehow engineered a way to use human excrement as fuel. People started to build the new city by making new energy with their excrement. Soon after, the city's leaders announced two legislations to generate and control the new energy; including installing ID chips in each citizens' anus to monitor the defecation level; providing an addictive juicybar to citizens in return. Soon enough, defecation amounts have skyrocketed and the city becomes full of addicts, due to juicybar's strong addictive qualities. An illegal juicybar trade becomes prevalent and its side effects has created dumb pint-sized mutants. The mutants later organize a gang, plundering juicybars, later becoming known as the Diaper Gang.

Section 4 travels back to the city (filled with juicybars), with police officers in their motorcycles for protection until the Diaper Gang hijacks it and kills everyone, they succeed but fail as Geko comes to kill off, once all gone, Aachi and Ssipak returns to the city. Aachi and Ssipak are street hoodlums who struggle to survive by trading black market Juicybars. Through a chain of events involving their porn-director acquaintance Jimmy the Freak, they meet a porn star named Beautiful, who gets a pink ring inside her butt which makes her defecations rewarded by exceptional quantities of Juicybars. For that reason, Beautiful is also wanted by the violent blue mutants known as the Diaper Gang (led by the Diaper King), the police (most notably the cyborg police officer Geko), and others.

Cast
 Ryoo Seung-bum as Aachi, one of main protagonists, a hoodlum who struggles to survive by trading Juicybars. In the English version, he is voiced by Ed Skudder.
 Im Chang-jung as Ssipak, one of main protagonists, a hoodlum who struggles to survive by trading Juicybars and falls in love with Beautiful. In the English version, he is voiced by Zack Keller.
 Hyun Young as Beautiful, one of main protagonists, a wannabe-actress who is wanted by the Diaper Gang and the police after Jimmy puts another chip to her butt, and can gush out thousands of Juicybars.
 Shin Hae-chul as Diaper King, the main antagonist, mutated king and leader of the illegal clan, Diaper Gang
 Yang Jeong Hwa as Diaper Gang, hoodlums and mutated minions of Diaper King
 Seo Hye-jeong as Jimmy the Freak, a porn director who creates illegal movies, friends with Aachi and Ssipak
 Oh In-yong as Gangster, the boss of a gang until loses all the juicybars and gets his leg broken, goes revenge
 Lee Gyu-hwa as The Deputy, a special police officer and cyborg that can kill the Diaper Gang
 Lee Gyu-hyeong

Production
The original story was proposed in 1998. To test different film techniques, demos using flash animation were made before attempting a theatrical version. In 2001,The flash animation versions of the film with four episodes were showcased in the 11th Yubari International Fantastic Film Festival. All six episodes premiered in an online theatre called cine4m with Aachi played by Ryoo Seung-bum and Ssipak played by Im Won-hee. The clip attracted three million hits, and the movie was originally scheduled for release at the end of 2002. Ryoo Seung-bum later revealed that it was hard to voice act in the film. There were also news reports that a game would be developed by teaming up with game company ziointeractive, expecting the film will be released in May 2005. The team eventually delayed the release date of the film to November 2005. 3.5 billion won was spent to produce the film.

After animated films My Beautiful Girl, Mari and Wonderful Days flopped despite huge expectations, Jo's film ran into investor problems, and the production team halted working on the animation for almost a year. It would take a total of eight years for the feature-length film to be finished.

Marketing
The film was marketed with interactive games and character merch such as t-shirts and in case of t-shirts, they were worn by celebrities such as Yoon Do-hyun and Shin dong yup. Albums were even released.

English dubbed version
Mondo Media hired Dick Figures creators, Ed Skudder and Zack Keller to rewrite a version of the film for English-speaking audiences. It was released digitally on February 11, 2014, and the DVD and Blu-ray were released a month later on March 11. Four minutes were cut, and dubbed English voice acting and an entirely new soundtrack (a DJ-rap music score by Mad Decent's Kevin Seaton) were added.

Release
Aachi & Ssipak opened in South Korean theaters on June 28, 2006. Like most of its predecessors in homegrown animation, it was well-reviewed, but a box office flop, with total ticket sales of 107,154. The film was invited to the 2007 36th International Film Festival Rotterdam.

In November 2020, the film was rereleased on theaters at Seoul Lotte cinema world tower joined by Nancy Lang.

References

External links 

 
 
 
 

2006 films
2006 animated films
Adult animated films
South Korean animated science fiction films
Animated comedy films
2000s science fiction comedy films
2000s dystopian films
Animated cyberpunk films
Films set in the future
2000s Korean-language films
2006 comedy films
2000s South Korean films
 2006 anime films